"C'mon C'mon" is a garage rock revival song by The Von Bondies, released in 2004 on the album Pawn Shoppe Heart. The song was the Von Bondies' only widely successful single.

In media
A shortened version of the song is the theme song for the American comedy-drama television show, Rescue Me. 

The song was one of the titular "nine songs" in the controversial film 9 Songs, which featured a live performance of the song by the band.

It is featured on the EA video games Burnout 3: Takedown, MVP Baseball 2004, Gretzky NHL, MTV's The Ashlee Simpson Show and a downloadable song on Rock Band 2. 

In 2019, the song was used in an advertisement for the Mercedes-Benz CLA Coupé.

Personnel
 Jason Stollsteimer – lead vocals, lead guitar
 Christy Hunt – rhythm guitar
 Leann Banks – lead bass
 Don Blum – drums, percussion

Chart performance

References

The Von Bondies songs
2004 songs
2004 singles